In the ADM formulation of general relativity one splits spacetime into spatial slices and time, the basic variables are taken to be the induced metric, on the spatial slice (the distance function induced on the spatial slice by the spacetime metric), and its conjugate momentum variable related to the extrinsic curvature, (this tells us how the spatial slice curves with respect to spacetime and is a measure of how the induced metric evolves in time). These are the metric canonical coordinates.

Dynamics such as time-evolutions of fields are controlled by the Hamiltonian constraint.

The identity of the Hamiltonian constraint is a major open question in quantum gravity, as is extracting of physical observables from any such specific constraint.

In 1986 Abhay Ashtekar introduced a new set of canonical variables, Ashtekar variables to represent an unusual way of rewriting the metric canonical variables on the three-dimensional spatial slices in terms of a SU(2) gauge field and its complementary variable. The Hamiltonian was much simplified in this reformulation. This led to the loop representation of quantum general relativity and in turn loop quantum gravity.

Within the loop quantum gravity representation Thiemann was able to formulate a mathematically rigorous operator as a proposal as such a constraint. Although this operator defines a complete and consistent quantum theory, doubts have been raised as to the physical reality of this theory due to inconsistencies with classical general relativity (the quantum constraint algebra closes, but it is not isomorphic to the classical constraint algebra of GR, which is seen as circumstantial evidence of inconsistencies definitely not a proof of inconsistencies), and so variants have been proposed.

Classical expressions for the Hamiltonian

Metric formulation 

However, this program soon became regarded as dauntingly difficult for various reasons, one being the non-polynomial nature of the Hamiltonian constraint:

where  is the scalar curvature of the three metric . Being a non-polynomial expression in the canonical variables and their derivatives it is very difficult to promote to a quantum operator.

Expression using Ashtekar variables 

The configuration variables of Ashtekar's variables behave like an  gauge field or connection . What do these variables have to do with gravity? The densitized triads can be used to reconstruct the spatial metric via

.

The densitized triads are not unique, and in fact one can perform a local in space rotation with respect to the internal indices . This is actually the origin of the  gauge invariance. The connection can be used to reconstruct the extrinsic curvature. The relation is given by

In terms of Ashtekar variables, the classical expression of the constraint is given by

.

where  field strength tensor of the gauge field  . Due to the factor  this in non-polynomial in the Ashtekar's variables. Since we impose the condition

,

we could consider the densitized Hamiltonian instead,

.

This Hamiltonian is now polynomial in the Ashtekar's variables. This development raised new hopes for the canonical quantum gravity programme. Although Ashtekar variables had the virtue of simplifying the Hamiltonian, it has the problem that the variables become complex. When one quantizes the theory it is a difficult task ensure that one recovers real general relativity as opposed to complex general relativity. Also there were also serious difficulties promoting the densitized Hamiltonian to a quantum operator.

A way of addressing the problem of reality conditions was noting that if we took the signature to be , that is Euclidean instead of Lorentzian, then one can retain the simple form of the Hamiltonian for but for real variables. One can then define what is called a generalized Wick rotation to recover the Lorentzian theory. Generalized as it is a Wick transformation in phase space and has nothing to do with analytical continuation of the time parameter .

Expression for real formulation of Ashtekar variables 

Thomas Thiemann was able to address both the above problems. He used the real connection

In real Ashtekar variables the full Hamiltonian is

.

where the constant  is the Barbero-Immirzi parameter. The constant  is -1 for Lorentzian signature and +1 for Euclidean signature. The  have a complicated relationship with the desitized triads and causes serious problems upon quantization. Ashtekar variables can be seen as choosing  to make the second more complicated term was made to vanish (the first term is denoted  because for the Euclidean theory this term remains for the real choice of ). Also we still have the problem of the   factor.

Thiemann was able to make it work for real . First he could simplify the troublesome  by using the identity

where  is the volume,

.

The first term of the Hamiltonian constraint becomes

upon using Thiemann's identity. This Poisson bracket is replaced by a commutator upon quantization. It turns out that a similar trick can be used to teat the second term. Why are the  given by the densitized triads ? It comes about from the compatibility condition

.

We can solve this in much the same way as the Levi-Civita connection can be calculated from the equation ; by rotating the various indices and then adding and subtracting them (see article spin connection for more details of the derivation, although there we use slightly different notation). We then rewrite this in terms of the densitized triad using that .

.

To circumvent the problems introduced by this complicated relationship Thiemann first defines the Gauss gauge invariant quantity

where , and notes that

.

We are then able to write

.

Why is it easier to quantize ? This is because it can be rewritten in terms of quantities that we already know how to quantize. Specifically  can be rewritten as

where we have used that the integrated densitized trace of the extrinsic curvature is the``time derivative of the volume".

Coupling to matter

Coupling to scalar field 

The Lagrangian for a scalar field in curved spacetime

.

where  are spacetime indices. We define the conjugate momentum of the scalar field with the usual , the Hamiltonian can be rewritten as,

,

In Ashtekar variables this reads,

As usual the (smeared) spatial diffeomorphisn constraint is associated with the shift function  and the (smeared) Hamiltonian is associated with the lapse function . So we simply read off the spatial diffeomorphism and Hamiltonian constraint,

.

These should be added (multiplied by ) to the spatial diffeomorphism  and Hamiltonian constraint of the gravitational field, respectively. This represents the coupling of scalar matter to gravity.

Coupling to Fermionic field 

There are problems coupling gravity to spinor fields: there are no finite-dimensional spinor representations of the general covariance group. However, there are of course spinorial representations of the Lorentz group. This fact is utilized by employing tetrad fields describing a flat tangent space at every point of spacetime. The Dirac matrices  are contracted onto vierbiens,

.

We wish to construct a generally covariant Dirac equation. Under a flat tangent space Lorentz transformation transforms the spinor as

We have introduced local Lorentz transformations on flat tangent space, so  is a function of space-time. This means that the partial derivative of a spinor is no longer a genuine tensor. As usual, one introduces a connection field  that allows us to gauge the Lorentz group. The covariant derivative defined with the spin connection is,

,

and is a genuine tensor and Dirac's equation is rewritten as

.

The Dirac action in covariant form is

The covariant derivative  is defined to annihilate the tetrad .

Coupling to Electromagnetic field 

The action for an electromagnetic field in curved spacetime is

where

is the field strength tensor, in components

and 

where the electric field is given by

and the magnetic field is.

.

The classical analysis with the Maxwell action followed by canonical formulation using the time gauge parametrisation results in:

Coupling to Yang–Mills field 

The action for a Yang–Mills field for some compact gauge group  in curved spacetime is

where  is the curvature of some connection. For the standard model .

Total Hamiltonian of matter coupled to gravity

The dynamics of the coupled gravity-matter system is simply defined by the adding of terms defining the matter dynamics to the gravitational hamiltonian. The full hamiltonian is described by 
 
.

Quantum Hamiltonian constraint 

In this section we discuss the quantization of the hamiltonian of pure gravity, that is in the absence of matter. The case of inclusion of matter is discussed in the next section.

The constraints in their primitive form are rather singular, and so should be `smeared' by appropriate test functions. The Hamiltonian is the written as

.

For simplicity we are only considering the "Euclidean" part of the Hamiltonian constraint, extension to the full constraint can be found in the literature. There are actually many different choices for functions, and so what one then ends up with an (smeared) Hamiltonians constraints. Demanding them all to vanish is equivalent to the original description.

The loop representation 

The Wilson loop is defined as

where  indicates a path ordering so that factors for smaller values of  appear to the left, and where the  satisfy the  algebra,

.

It is easy to see from this that,

.

implies that .

Wilson loops are not independent of each other, and in fact certain linear combinations of them called spin network states form an orthonormal basis. As spin network functions form a basis we can formally expand any Gauss gauge invariant function as,

.

This is called the inverse loop transform. The loop transform is given by

and is analogous to what one does when one goes over to the momentum representation in quantum mechanics,

.

The loop transform defines the loop representation. Given an operator  in the connection representation,

,

we define  by the loop transform,

.

,

or

,

where by  we mean the operator  but with the reverse factor ordering. We evaluate the action of this operator on the spin network as a calculation in the connection representation and rearranging the result as a manipulation purely in terms of loops (one should remember that when considering the action on the spin network one should choose the operator one wishes to transform with the opposite factor ordering to the one chosen for its action on wavefunctions ). This gives the physical meaning of the operator . For example, if  were a spatial diffeomorphism, then this can be thought of as keeping the connection field  of the  where it is while performing a spatial diffeomorphism on  instead.

The holonomy operator in the loop representation is the multiplication operator,

Promotion of the Hamiltonian constraint to a quantum operator 

We promote the Hamiltonian constraint to a quantum operator in the loop representation. One introduces a lattice regularization procedure. we assume that space has been divided into tetrahedra . One builds an expression such that the limit in which the tetrahedra shrink in size approximates the expression for the Hamiltonian constraint.

For each tetrahedron pick a vertex and call . We now construct a loop

by moving along  then along the line joining the points  and  that are not  (which we have denoted ) and then returning to  along . The holonomy

along a line in the limit the tetrahedron shrinks approximates the connection via

where  is a vector in the direction of edge . It can be shown that

.

(this expresses the fact that the field strength tensor, or curvature, measures the holonomy around `infinitesimal loops'). We are led to trying

where the sum is over all tetrahedra . Substituting for the holonomies,

.

The identity will have vanishing Poisson bracket with the volume, so the only contribution will come from the connection. As the Poisson bracket is already proportional to  only the identity part of the holonomy  outside the bracket contributes. The three lengths 's that appear combine with the summation in the limit to produce an integral.

This expression immediately can be promoted to an operator in the loop representation, both holonomies and volume promote to well defined operators there.

The triangulation is chosen to so as to be adapted to the spin network state one is acting on by choosing the vertices an lines appropriately. There will be many lines and vertices of the triangulation that do not correspond to lines and vertices of the spin network when one takes the limit. Due to the presence of the volume the Hamiltonian constraint will only contribute when there are at least three non-coplanar lines of a vertex.

Here we have only considered the action of the Hamiltonian constraint on trivalent vertices. Computing the action on higher valence vertices is more complicated. We refer the reader to the article by Borissov, De Pietri, and Rovelli.

A finite theory 

The Hamiltonian is not invariant under spatial diffeomorphisms and therefore its action can only be defined on the kinematic space. One can transfer its action to diffeomorphsm invariant states. As we will see this has implications for where precisely the new line is added. Such a state is not in the kinematic space but belongs to the larger dual space of a dense subspace of the kinematic space.

.

The position of the added line is then irrelevant. When one projects on  the position of the line does not matter because one is working on the space of diffeomorphism invariant states and so the line can be moved "closer" or "further" from the vertex without changing the result.

Spatial diffeomorphism plays a crucial role in the construction. If the functions were not diffeomorphism invariant, the added line would have to be shrunk to the vertex and possible divergences could appear.

The same construction can be applied to the Hamiltonian of general relativity coupled to matter: scalar fields, Yang–Mills fields, fermions. In all cases the theory is finite, anomaly free and well defined. Gravity appears to be acting as a "fundamental regulator" of theories of matter.

Anomaly free 

Quantum anomalies occur when the quantum constraint algebra has additional terms that don't have classical counterparts. In order to recover the correct semi classical theory these extra terms need to vanish, but this implies additional constraints and reduces the number of degrees of freedom of the theory making it unphysical. Theimann's Hamiltonian constraint can be shown to be anomaly free.

The kernel of the Hamiltonian constraint 

The kernel is the space of states which the Hamiltonian constraint annihilates. One can outline an explicit construction of the complete and rigorous kernel of the proposed operator. They are the first with non-zero volume and which do not need non-zero cosmological constant.

The complete space of solutions to the spatial diffeomorphism  for all  constraints has already been found long ago. And even was equipped with a natural inner product induced from that of the kinematical Hilbert space  of solutions to the Gauss constraint. Hence one cannot simply solve the spatial diffeomorphisms constraint and then the Hamiltonian constraint and so the inner product structure of  cannot be employed in the construction of the physical inner product.

More to come here...

Criticisms of the Hamiltonian constraint 

Recovering the constraint algebra. Classically we have

where

 
As we know in the loop representation a self-adjoint operator generating spatial diffeomorphisms. Therefore, it is not possible to implement the relation  for in the quantum theory with infinitesimal , it is at most possible with finite spatial dffeomoephisms.

Ultra locality of the Hamiltonian: The Hamiltonian only acts at vertices and acts by "dressing" the vertex with lines. It does not interconnect vertices nor change the valences of the lines (outside the "dressing"). The modifications that the Hamiltonian constraint operator performs at a given vertex do not propagate over the whole graph but are confined to a neighbourhood of the vertex. In fact, repeated action of the Hamiltonian generates more and more new edges ever closer to the vertex never intersecting each other. In particular there is no action at the new vertices created. This implies, for instance, that for surfaces that enclose a vertex (diffeomorphically invariantly defined) the area of such surfaces would commute with the Hamiltonian, implying no "evolution" of these areas as it is the Hamiltonian that generates "evolution". This hints at the theory ``failing to propagate". However, Thiemann points out that the Hamiltonian acts every where.

These difficulties could be addressed by a new approach - the Master constraint programme.

Extension of Quantisation to Inclusion of Matter Fields

Fermionic matter

Maxwell's theory

Note that  are both of density weight 1. As usual, before quantisation, we need to express the constraints (and other observables) in terms of the holonomies and fluxes.

As before, we introduce a cell decomposition and noting,

.

Yang–Mills

Apart from the non-Abelian nature of the gauge field, in form, the expressions proceed in the same manner as for the Maxwell case.

Scalar field - Higgs field

The elementary configuration operators are analogous of the holonomy operator for connection variables and they act by multiplication as

.

These are called point holonomies. The conjugate variable to the point holonomy which is promoted to an operator in the quantum theory, is taken to be the smeared field momentum

Their Poisson bracket is given by

.

In the quantum theory one looks for a representation of the Poisson bracket as a commutator of the elementary operators,

.

Finiteness of Theory with the Inclusion of Matter

Thiemann has illustrated how the ultraviolet diverges of ordinary quantum theory can be directly interpreted as a consequence of the approximation that disregards the quantised, discrete, nature of quantum geometry. For instance Thiemann shows how the operator for the Yang–Mills Hamiltonian involving  is well defined so long as we treat  as an operator, but becomes infinite as soon as we replace  with a smooth background field.

The Master constraint programme

The Master constraint 

The Master Constraint Programme for Loop Quantum Gravity (LQG) was proposed as a classically equivalent way to impose the infinite number of Hamiltonian constraint equations

in terms of a single Master constraint,

.

which involves the square of the constraints in question. Note that  were infinitely many whereas the Master constraint is only one. It is clear that if  vanishes then so do the infinitely many 's. Conversely, if all the 's vanish then so does , therefore they are equivalent.

The Master constraint  involves an appropriate averaging over all space and so is invariant under spatial diffeomorphisms (it is invariant under spatial "shifts" as it is a summation over all such spatial "shifts" of a quantity that transforms as a scalar). Hence its Poisson bracket with the (smeared) spatial diffeomorphism constraint, is simple:

.

(it is  invariant as well). Also, obviously as any quantity Poisson commutes with itself, and the Master constraint being a single constraint, it satisfies

.

We also have the usual algebra between spatial diffeomorphisms. This represents a dramatic simplification of the Poisson bracket structure.

Promotion to quantum operator 

Let us write the classical expression in the form

.

Define

.

That is,

.

Thus we proceed exactly as for the Hamiltonian constraint and introduce a partition into tetrahedra, splitting both integrals into sums,

.

However, it can be shown that graph-changing, spatially diffeomorphism invariant operators such as the Master constraint cannot be defined on the kinematic Hilbert space .

What is done first is, we are able to compute the matrix elements of the would-be operator , that is, we compute the quadratic form . We would like there to be a unique, positive, self-adjoint operator  whose matrix elements reproduce . It has been shown that such an operator exists and is given by the Friedrichs extension.

Solving the Master constraint and inducing the physical Hilbert space 

As mentioned above one cannot simply solve the spatial diffeomorphism constraint and then the Hamiltonian constraint, inducing a physical inner product from the spatial diffeomorphism inner product, because the Hamiltonian constraint maps spatially diffeomorphism invariant states onto non-spatial diffeomorphism invariant states.

References

External links
Overview by Carlo Rovelli
Thiemann's paper in Physics Letters
Good information on LQG

Loop quantum gravity